The meridian 93° east of Greenwich is a line of longitude that extends from the North Pole across the Arctic Ocean, Asia, the Indian Ocean, the Southern Ocean, and Antarctica to the South Pole.

The 93rd meridian east forms a great circle with the 87th meridian west.

From Pole to Pole
Starting at the North Pole and heading south to the South Pole, the 93rd meridian east passes through:

{| class="wikitable plainrowheaders"
! scope="col" width="120" | Co-ordinates
! scope="col" | Country, territory or sea
! scope="col" | Notes
|-
| style="background:#b0e0e6;" | 
! scope="row" style="background:#b0e0e6;" | Arctic Ocean
| style="background:#b0e0e6;" |
|-valign="top"
| 
! scope="row" | 
| Krasnoyarsk Krai — Komsomolets Island, Pioneer Island, October Revolution Island and the Sedov Archipelago, Severnaya Zemlya
|-
| style="background:#b0e0e6;" | 
! scope="row" style="background:#b0e0e6;" | Kara Sea
| style="background:#b0e0e6;" |
|-valign="top"
| 
! scope="row" | 
| Krasnoyarsk Krai Tuva Republic — from 
|-
| 
! scope="row" | 
| For about 11 km
|-
| 
! scope="row" | 
| Tuva Republic — for about 10 km
|-
| 
! scope="row" | 
|
|-valign="top"
| 
! scope="row" |  
| Xinjiang Gansu — from  Qinghai — from  Tibet — from 
|-valign="top"
| 
! scope="row" | 
| Arunachal Pradesh — claimed by  Assam — from  Mizoram — from  Manipur — for 5 km from  Mizoram — from 
|-
| 
! scope="row" |  (Burma)
|
|-
| style="background:#b0e0e6;" | 
! scope="row" style="background:#b0e0e6;" | Indian Ocean
| style="background:#b0e0e6;" | Bay of Bengal
|-valign="top"
| 
! scope="row" | 
| North Andaman Island and Ritchie's Archipelago, Andaman Islands
|-valign="top"
| style="background:#b0e0e6;" | 
! scope="row" style="background:#b0e0e6;" | Indian Ocean
| style="background:#b0e0e6;" | Passing just east of the island of Car Nicobar, Nicobar Islands,  (at ) Passing just west of the island of Teressa, Nicobar Islands,  (at )
|-valign="top"
| style="background:#b0e0e6;" | 
! scope="row" style="background:#b0e0e6;" | Southern Ocean
|-
| 
! scope="row" | Antarctica
| Australian Antarctic Territory, claimed by 
|-
|}

e093 meridian east